This is a list of lakes in South Dakota.

See also

List of rivers of South Dakota

Sources

Lake Surveys, Maps, and Fishing Forecasts
Northeast South Dakota fish surveys
Southeast South Dakota fish surveys
Western South Dakota fish surveys
Great Lakes of South Dakota Association
Maps of South Dakota Lakes
SD State Parks and Recreation Areas
MN DNR Lake facts
MN DNR Lake finder

References

Lakes
South Dakota